is a Japanese masculine given name and family name meaning "dragon", "noble", "prosperous", or "flow". Ryū, Ryu, or ryu may also refer to:

Fiction
 Ryū (manga), a 1986 series by Masao Yajima and Akira Oze
 , a 1919 book by Ryūnosuke Akutagawa
 Monthly Comic Ryū, a manga magazine in Japan

Characters
 Ryu (Breath of Fire), the protagonist in the Breath of Fire series
 Ryu (Street Fighter), a leading character in the Street Fighter franchise
 Ryu Hayabusa, the protagonist in the Ninja Gaiden series
 Ryu Higashi, a character from J.A.K.Q. Dengekitai
 Ryu Jose, a character from Mobile Suit Gundam
 Ryu Kumon, a minor character in Ranma 1/2
 Ryu Nakanishi, Science Ninja Team member G-5
 Ryu Tanaka, a character from Haikyuu!!
 Ryu Tendoh, a character from Choujin Sentai Jetman
 Ryū Tsuji, a character from Special A
 "Wooden Sword" Ryu, a Shaman King character
 A character from Fist of the North Star

People
 Chishū Ryū (笠 智衆, 1904–1993), Japanese actor 
 Hirofumi Ryu (笠 浩史, born 1965), Japanese politician
 Ryu Fujisaki (藤崎 竜, born 1971), Japanese manga artist
 Ryu Lee, an alternate ring name of the Mexican wrestler Dragon Lee
 Ryu Matsumoto (松本 龍, born 1951), Japanese politician
 Ryu Shionoya (塩谷 立, born 1950), Japanese politician 
 Ryu, a member of the musical group Styles of Beyond
 Ryutaro Nakahara (Ryu☆), Japanese musician and DJ

Other uses
 Ryū, the word for a Japanese dragon
 Ryū (school), a school of thought or discipline (for example a fighting school)
 ryu, the ISO 639-3 code for the Okinawan language
 Ryu SDN, an open source component-based Software-defined networking framework

See also
 Ryu (Korean name) (유 or 류 / 柳, 劉, 兪, 庾), a common Korean family name
 

Japanese masculine given names